Guernsey competed at the 2018 Commonwealth Games in the Gold Coast, Australia from 4 April to 15 April 2018.  Guernsey's team consisted of 31 athletes across eight sports. It was Guernsey's 13th appearance at the Commonwealth Games.

The first seven competitors were announced in September 2017. The final team members were announced on 24 November 2017. The overall team consisted of 24 men and seven women. 

Sport shooter Matthew Guille was the island's flag bearer during the opening ceremony.

Competitors
The following is the list of number of competitors participating at the Games per sport/discipline.

Athletics (track and field)

Guernsey's athletics team consisted of four athletes (three men and one woman). 

Track & road events

Badminton

Guernsey's badminton team consisted of four athletes (two men and two women).

Boxing

Guernsey's entered one boxer.

Men

Cycling

Guernsey's cycling team consisted of eight athletes (seven men and one woman).

Road
Men

Women

Mountain bike

Lawn bowls

Guernsey's lawn bowls team consisted of four athletes (three men and one woman).

Shooting

Guernsey's entered six shooters (five men and one woman).

Men

Women

Open

Swimming

Guernsey's entered three swimmers (two men and one woman).

Men

Women

Triathlon

Guernsey's entered one triathlete.

Individual

References

Nations at the 2018 Commonwealth Games
Guernsey at the Commonwealth Games
2018 in Guernsey